O Trapalhão na Arca de Noé is a 1983 Brazilian adventure parody film, directed by Del Rangel and starring Renato Aragão. This film is loosely based in the story of Noah's Ark and Steven Spielberg's Raiders of the Lost Ark, with humorous effects.

Plot 
The zoo janitor Duda and Kiko and Zeca friends form a group of animal protection. Therefore, they are called by the mystical Noah for a rescue mission of the Pantanal fauna and flora. The area is threatened with extinction due to exploitation of Morel skin smugglers and his foreman Juarez. They accept the mission and on the way are the archaeologist Marcos and Carla photographer in search of a pyramid left in place by the Phoenician civilization. Together, the bad guys win and in the end, Duda is invited by Noah to join a group of special people who will populate a new world.

Production
Renato Aragão said that O Trapalhão na Arca de Noé was inspired by Steven Spielberg's Raiders of the Lost Ark. It was done during the separation of the Trapalhões, which lasted only six months. Dedé Santana, Mussum and Zacarias made the film Atrapalhando a Suate, and there was competition between the two films in theaters. The song chosen for the opening of the film is called "Mars: Bringer of War" by The Planets composed by Gustav Holst.

Cast 
Renato Aragão .... Duda
Sérgio Mallandro .... Kiko
Fábio Villa Verde .... Zeca
Nádia Lippi .... Carla
Manfredo Colassanti .... Noé
Gracindo Júnior .... Marcos
Milton Moraes .... Morel
Dary Reis .... Juarez
Carlos Kurt
Xuxa Meneghel .... Lira, the Duda's intergalactic partner

See also 
 List of Brazilian films of the 1980s

References

External links 
 

Os Trapalhões
Brazilian adventure films
Brazilian children's films
Films shot in Rio de Janeiro (city)
1983 films
Brazilian romantic comedy films
Noah's Ark in film
Brazilian parody films
1980s musical comedy films
1983 comedy films